Zurab Rtveliashvili (16 October 1967 – 20 April 2021) was a Georgian poet and multi-media performer. Rtveliashvili was born in Karaganda, Kazakhstan. He is featured in the 2009 documentary film At the Top of My Voice.

In 2010, Rtveliashvili was offered asylum in Stockholm, Sweden, from persecution in his native Georgia.

Death  
Rtveliashvili died in Tbilisi after a battle with cancer on 20 April 2021.

Publications
I-reqtsia (1997)
Apokrifi (2001)
Anarqi (2006)

References

20th-century poets from Georgia (country)
1967 births
2021 deaths
Multimedia artists
Male poets from Georgia (country)
21st-century poets from Georgia (country)
20th-century male writers
21st-century male writers
People from Karaganda